In Major League Baseball, the 300-win club is the group of pitchers who have won 300 or more games. Twenty-four pitchers have reached this milestone. This list does not include Bobby Mathews who won 297 in the major leagues plus several more in 1869 and 1870 before the major leagues were established in 1871. The San Francisco Giants are the only franchise to see four players reach 300 wins while on their roster: Tim Keefe in the Players' League, Christy Mathewson and Mickey Welch while the team was in New York, and most recently Randy Johnson. Early in the history of professional baseball, many of the rules favored the pitcher over the batter; the distance pitchers threw to home plate was shorter than today, and pitchers were able to use foreign substances to alter the direction of the ball. Moreover, pitchers started games far more frequently than modern pitchers do; in the second half of the 1884 season Old Hoss Radbourne started every other game. The first player to win 300 games was Pud Galvin in 1888. Seven pitchers recorded all or the majority of their career wins in the 19th century: Galvin, Cy Young, Kid Nichols, Keefe, John Clarkson, Charles Radbourn, and Welch. Four more pitchers joined the club in the first quarter of the 20th century: Mathewson, Walter Johnson, Eddie Plank, and Grover Cleveland Alexander. Young is the all-time leader in wins with 511, a mark that is considered unbreakable. If a modern-day pitcher won 20 games per season for 25 seasons, he would still be 11 games short of Young's mark.

Only three pitchers—Lefty Grove, Warren Spahn, and Early Wynn—joined the 300-win club between 1924 and 1982, which may be explained by a number of factors: the abolition of the spitball; World War II military service, such as Bob Feller's; and the growing importance of the home run in the game. As the home run became commonplace, the physical and mental demands on pitchers dramatically increased, which led to the use of a four-man starting rotation. Between 1982 and 1990, the 300-win club gained six members: Gaylord Perry, Phil Niekro, Steve Carlton, Nolan Ryan, Don Sutton, and Tom Seaver. These pitchers benefited from the increased use of specialized relief pitchers, an expanded strike zone, and new stadiums, including Shea Stadium, Dodger Stadium and the Astrodome, that were pitcher's parks, which suppressed offensive production. Also, the increasing sophistication of training methods and sports medicine - such as Tommy John surgery - allowed players to maintain a high competitive level for a longer time. Randy Johnson, for example, won more games in his 40s than he did in his 20s.

Since 1990, only four pitchers have joined the 300-win club: Roger Clemens, Greg Maddux, Tom Glavine, and Randy Johnson. Changes in the game in the last decade of the 20th century have made attaining 300 career wins difficult, perhaps more so than during the mid-20th century. The four-man starting rotation has given way to a five-man rotation, which gives starting pitchers fewer chances to pick up wins. No pitcher reached 20 wins in a non-strike-shortened year for the first time in 2006; this was repeated in 2009 and 2017.

Recording 300 career wins has been seen as a guaranteed admission to the Baseball Hall of Fame. Clemens fell off the ballot in 2022 and can only be elected via the players' Contemporary Baseball Era ballot of the Veterans Committee. Clemens' future election is seen as uncertain because of his alleged links to use of performance-enhancing drugs. To be eligible for the Hall of Fame, a player must have "been retired five seasons" or deceased for at least six months, Many observers expect the club to gain few, if any, members in the foreseeable future. Ten members of the 300-win club are also members of the 3,000 strikeout club.

Members

See also

Baseball statistics
List of Major League Baseball leaders in games started
List of Major League Baseball career wins leaders
3,000 strikeout club

Notes

Sources

References

Wins 300
Major League Baseball statistics